The 10th Regiment (widely known as the Feltherrens Fodregiment) was a Danish Army infantry regiment. On 1 September 1961 it was merged with 8. Regiment and from 1 November 1961 the new regiment was known as Dronningens Livregiment. The name Feltherrens Fodregiment was never the official name, as the official name was 10. Regiment.

History
The Regiment was raised during 1703 in Italy, as part of the Danish corps fighting in foreign service. On its return to Denmark it continued directly into the Great Northern War against Sweden. It further participated in the First Schleswig War (1848–1850) and the Second Schleswig War (1864). The regimental flag had the battle honour Gadebusch 1712, Fredericia 1848 and Dybbøl 1864.

It has been garrisoned in Holstein, Sønderjylland and Nørrejylland, and for a short while in Copenhagen. After the war of 1864 it was garrisoned in Aalborg, from 1938 in Viborg and from 1 January 1952 back in Aalborg.

In 1961, the newly raised 2nd Jutlandic Brigade took over the Coat of Arms from 10th regiment (Feltherrens Fodregiment)

Names of the regiment

Standards

References

 Lærebog for Hærens Menige, Hærkommandoen, marts 1960

Danish Army regiments
1703 establishments in Denmark
Military units and formations established in 1703